Gábor Szalafai (born 13 April 1985) is a Hungarian handball player for Gyöngyösi KK and the Hungarian national team.

References

1985 births
Living people
Hungarian male handball players